The African moon tetra (Bathyaethiops caudomaculatus) is a species of African tetra, found in slow flowing rivers of the middle and lower course of the Congo River. The fish is often kept in aquaria but little is known about is its distribution and habits.

Appearance
B. caudomaculatus measures around 8 cm long, it is a relatively deep bodied fish with a general gold coloration, which is interrupted by a large black spot at the base of the caudal fin of the fish. There is also a small red spot visible under the dorsal fin, this is smaller in females (which are generally deeper bodied). The fish has typically large eyes and clear fins.

Distribution
B. caudomaculatus is found in the central and lower Congo River basin where it inhabits densely vegetated streams and backwaters.

Habits
This is a shoaling fish which is often found around underwater structures or below floating plants. B. caudomaculatus is omnivorous feeding on small aquatic insects as well as plant matter.

References

Tetras
Freshwater fish of Africa
Taxa named by Jacques Pellegrin
Fish described in 1925